The AVN Awards are film awards sponsored and presented by the American adult video industry trade magazine AVN (Adult Video News) to recognize achievement in various aspects of the creation and marketing of American pornographic films. They are often called the "Oscars of porn".

The awards are divided into over 100 categories, some of which are analogous to industry awards offered in other film and video genres and others that are specific to pornographic/erotic film and video.

AVN sponsored the first AVN Awards ceremony in February 1984. The award ceremony occurs in early January during the AVN Adult Entertainment Expo in Las Vegas, Nevada. Since 2008, the ceremony has aired in a form edited for time on Showtime, which is usually broadcast in a 90-minute time slot.

Awards for gay adult video were a part of the AVN Awards from the 1987 ceremony through the 1998 ceremony. The increasing number of categories made the show unwieldy. For the 1999 ceremony AVN Magazine began hosting the GayVN Awards, an annual adult movie award event for gay adult video.

Categories
 Best Actor
 Best Actress
 Best Supporting Actor
 Best Supporting Actress
 Male Performer of the Year
 Female Performer of the Year
 Male Foreign Performer of the Year
 Female Foreign Performer of the Year
 Transgender Performer of the Year
 Director of the Year
 Best New Starlet
 Best Director
 Best Non-Sex Performance
 Best Cinematography
 Best All-Sex Video
 Best Renting Title of the Year
 Best Selling Title of the Year
 Best Film
 Best Video Feature
 Best Foreign Feature
 Best Tease Performance
 Best All-Girl Sex Scene
 Best All-Girl Feature
 Best Newcomer – Gay Video
 Best Bi-Sexual Video
 Best Gay Video
 Best Actor – Gay Video
 Best Supporting Actor – Gay Video
 Best Director – Bi-Sexual Video
 Best Director – Gay Video
 Best Screenplay – Gay Video
 Best Sex Scene – Gay Video
 Best Non-Sexual Performance – Bi, Gay, or Trans Video
 Best Gay Alternative Video
 Best Gay Solo Video
 Best Gay Specialty Release
 Best Videography – Gay Video
 Best Alternative Adult Feature Film
 Most Outrageous Sex Scene
 Best Sex Comedy
 Breakthrough Award
 Best Performer of the Year – Gay Video
 Best Male Newcomer
 Best Director – Foreign Release
 Best Classic Release
 Best DVD
 Best High Definition Production
 Unsung Starlet of the Year
 Best High-End All-Sex Release
 Best All-Sex Release
 Best MILF Release
 Best Director – Feature
 Best Director – Foreign Feature
 Best Boy/Girl Scene
 Best All-Girl Couples Sex Scene
 MILF Performer of the Year

Honorary award
 AVN Hall of Fame

Reception and review 
Originally, the awards show was part of the Consumer Electronics Show (CES) in Las Vegas, but it grew and garnered more attention over time, allowing it to be established as a separate event in the 1990s. The event started out as the "Adult Software exhibition" of the show, which attracted as many as 100,000 visitors in addition to those attending CES. When the show became a separate event, it initially moved to Caesar's Palace, but it has since moved to other Las Vegas venues.

A writer from Los Angeles magazine made the claim in 2006 that awards often go to consistent advertisers in AVN magazine. In his article, the writer stated: "Imagine the editors of Variety choosing the Academy Award nominations—then handing out Oscars to the winners—and you have a pretty good idea of how much manipulation can go on behind the scenes during the run-up to the AVNs. [...] Actresses trying to secure a nomination stop in to schmooze at the magazine's Chatsworth offices. [An agency] client once presented dolls of herself to editors and writers. Another baked cookies". Similar allegations have been made regarding the Academy Award nominations and influencing Academy member voting that date back to at least 1988 with regard to movies such as Rain Man.

In 2013, actress Tanya Tate offered some insights into the industry in an interview with the Huffington Post about the 30th AVN Awards at which she was nominated for an award. She stated: "If you are more popular with the fans, companies are more likely to book you for their production", "Being nominated for awards help build your recognition with your fan base. People that win male and female performer of the year are generally solid consistent talent that are open to many 'levels', and some of these performers already have higher basic rates than others".

AVN Award winners 
Listed below are the winners of the AVN Award in various major categories over the following years:

1984–1989

1990–1994

1995–1999 
 

 From 1999 onwards, AVN Magazine began hosting the GayVN Awards, an annual adult movie award event for gay adult video.

2000–2004

2005–2009 

 The category, introduced in 2007, was first called "Underrated Starlet of the Year (Unrecognized Excellence)". It has since been renamed to "Unsung Starlet of the Year".

2010–2014

2015–2019

2020–2022

Hall of Fame

Reuben Sturman Award 

 2000 David Sturman, General Video of America West
 2001 Ed Powers, Ed Powers Productions
 2001 Mark Kernes, Senior Editor, AVN
 2002 Gloria Leonard, Past President, AVA and Free Speech Coalition
 2002 Elyse Metcalf, Retailer Elyse's Passion
 2003 Mel Kamins, General Video of America, Cleveland
 2005 Harry Mohney, Déjà Vu Showgirls
 2006 Robert and Janet Zicari, Extreme Associates
 2007 Paul Cambria, Clyde DeWitt and Louis Sirkin
 2011 John Stagliano
 2013 Lasse Braun

See also

 Transgender Erotica Awards
 Pornhub Awards 
 XBIZ Awards
 Venus Award
 Sexual Freedom Awards
 SHAFTA Awards
 F.A.M.E. Awards
 XRCO Award

References

External links

 
 Adult Video News Awards  at the Internet Movie Database
 "The History of the Porn Awards and Las Vegas"

 
Pornographic film awards
1984 establishments in Nevada
20th-century awards
21st-century awards
American annual television specials
American pornographic film awards
Annual events in the United States
Awards established in 1984
Culture of Las Vegas
Playboy TV original programming
Pornography in Nevada
Showtime (TV network) original programming